Hypochlorosis is a genus of butterflies in the family Lycaenidae. The species of this genus are found on New Guinea and in the Moluccas in the Australasian realm.

Species
Hypochlorosis ancharia (Hewitson, 1869)
Hypochlorosis antipha (Hewitson, 1869)
Hypochlorosis lorquinii (C. Felder & R. Felder, 1865)

References
, 1894. Descriptions of three new Lycaenidae from New Guinea. Annals and Magazine of Natural History (6)13: 252-255.
 1973: The higher classification of the Lycaenidae (Lepidoptera): a tentative arrangement. Bulletin of the British Museum (Natural History), Entomology, 28: 371-505.
, 1863–1878.  Illustrations of Diurnal Lepidoptera, Lycaenidae. London, van Vorst, x + 229 pp. Text Plates.
, 1998. The Butterflies of Papua New Guinea Academic Press, 
, 1892. In  & , Exot. Schmett. 2. Die Familien und Gattungen der Tagfalter (6), pp. 225–284, pls 43–50. Fürth.

External links

"Hypochlorosis Röber, [1892]" at Markku Savela's Lepidoptera and Some Other Life Forms

Theclinae
Lycaenidae genera
Taxa named by Julius Röber